Zhao Defang (c. 959–981) was an imperial prince of imperial China's Song Dynasty. He was the fourth son of Emperor Taizu and the younger brother of Zhao Dezhao.

He was the 3rd great-grandfather of Emperor Xiaozong of Song.

Family 
Parents
Zhao Kuangyin, Taizu (太祖 趙匡胤; 21 March 927 – 14 November 976)
Empress Xiaohui, of the He clan (孝惠皇后 賀氏; 929–958)
Consorts and Issue:
Lady Jiao, of the Jiao clan (焦氏), daughter of Jiao Jixun (焦继勋)
Zhao Weixu (趙惟敘; 977–1011), first son
Zhao Weixian (趙惟憲; 979–1016), second son
Lady Fu, of the Fu clan  of Weiguo  (卫国符氏), granddaughter of Fu Yanqing (符彥卿)
Zhao Weining (趙惟能; 979 – 1008), third son
Lady Wang, of the Wang clan of Qinguo (秦国王氏)
Lady Li , of the Li clan of Yingchuan (颖川李氏)
Unknown:
Princess Yongshou (永寿县主)
married Cui Congshi (崔从湜)

Biography
In 976, Zhao Defang had his first official appointment as the Defense Commissioner of Guizhou, which was quickly followed by appointments of Prefect of Xingyuan (興元, today's Hanzhong), Military Commissioner of Shannanxi Circuit (山南西道, around today's Sichuan) and chancellor. In the winter of 978 he was named Grand Commandant of Inspection (檢校太尉). He died in 981 from an unnamed illness at the young age of 23. Emperor Taizong, his uncle, visited his coffin in tears and cancelled imperial court meetings for 5 days to commemorate him.

In fiction 
In popular stories, including the Generals of the Yang Family legends and Seven Heroes and Five Gallants, Zhao Defang is known as the "Eighth Prince" (八王爺) or "Eighth Virtuous Prince" (八賢王), but this character seems to be a "merger" between Zhao Defang and Zhao Defang's cousin Zhao Yuanyan.

The breakdown:

The "Eighth Virtuous Prince" in Seven Heroes and Five Gallants was clearly based on the historical Zhao Yuanyan, who 
 was the only paternal uncle during Emperor Renzong's reign
 had conflicts with Empress Dowager Liu 
 eventually revealed the secret about the Emperor Renzong's real birth mother (see Consort Li)

Notes and references

Sources

950s births
Year of birth uncertain
981 deaths
Song dynasty princes